Arnold Sedgfield "Saturday" Knight (16 December 1885 - 1 July 1946) was a South African international rugby union player.

Knight, who played his club rugby with the Pirates, represented Transvaal in provincial fixtures. He was a member of the South African side which toured the British Isles, France and Ireland in 1912/13. A forward, he appeared in all five Test matches, making his debut against Scotland and then playing Ireland, Wales, England and France.

He also played a first-class cricket match, for a "Rest of South Africa" team, against Wanderers in 1908. He scored five in his first innings and 15 in the second.

References

1885 births
South African rugby union players
South Africa international rugby union players
South African cricketers
1946 deaths
Rugby union forwards
Rugby union players from the Eastern Cape
Golden Lions players
People from Burgersdorp